Luis Alberto Aparicio Alejandro Lacalle Pou (born 10 August 1973) is a Uruguayan politician and lawyer serving as President of Uruguay since 1 March 2020.

Son of former president Luis Alberto Lacalle, Lacalle Pou attended The British Schools of Montevideo and graduated from Catholic University of Uruguay in 1998 with a law degree. A member of the National Party, he was first elected to the Chamber of Representatives at the 1999 election as a National Representative for the Canelones Department, a position he held from 2000 to 2015. During the first session of the 47th Legislature (2011–2012) he chaired the lower house of the General Assembly. He also served as Senator from 2015 to 2019. He ran unsuccessfully for president in 2014. Five years later, he defeated the Broad Front nominee and former mayor of Montevideo Daniel Martínez in the 2019 general election and was elected President of Uruguay with 50.79% of the vote in the second round. At the age of 46, Lacalle Pou ended the 15-year leftist rule in the country and became the youngest president since the end of the dictatorship in 1985.

Early life
Luis Alberto Aparicio Alejandro Lacalle Pou was born on 10 August 1973 in Montevideo. He is the son of former president Luis Alberto Lacalle and former first lady and senator Julia Pou.  He has two siblings, Pilar and Juan José, and is the great-grandson of Luis Alberto de Herrera, on his paternal side.
                                                                              
He lived in the barrio Pocitos during childhood and adolescence. When his father took office as president in 1990, his family moved to the Suárez presidential residence in barrio Prado. At the age of 14, a medical consultation in the United States revealed that he had a growth hormone problem. He underwent treatment with hormone injections that allowed him to reach an adult height of 1.70 meters. 
                                                                     
He was educated at The British Schools of Montevideo. As his final years at the school coincided with his father's elevation to the presidency, a guard was posted at the school gates while he and his younger brother attended class. Resisting official protocol to be taken to school in a car by government escort, he instead preferred to drive himself in an old family vehicle. In 1993 he enrolled at the Catholic University of Uruguay to study law, graduating in 1998. At that time he was a marijuana and cocaine user. He is also passionate about surfing, which he has practiced since his childhood.
                                                                                                
Lacalle Pou is married to Lorena Ponce de León, a landscape architect who is involved with him in politics, and has three children, two of whom were born through in vitro fertilization.

Political career
In the 1999 general elections, he was elected representative for Canelones, serving the 2000–2005 term. He was re-elected in 2004 under the Herrerist faction of the National Party, a movement founded by his great-grandfather, Luis Alberto de Herrera. In the 2009 general elections, he was elected for a third consecutive time and served until 2015.

As leader of the opposition, he opposed the most emblematic laws of the left-wing governments (legalization of abortion, recognition of gay marriage, law on the workday of agricultural workers, laws in favor of domestic workers, etc.). He defines himself as very religious, which is why he emphasizes his commitment against abortion.

He was a candidate for Intendant of Canelones in the 2010 municipal election, obtaining 22.82% of the votes and being defeated by Marcos Carámbula of the Broad Front.

Lacalle Pou is the leader of the political lists 404 (Montevideo) and 400 (Canelones).

Presidential candidacies

2014 
On 30 March 2014, Lacalle Pou launched his bid for the presidency. On 1 June 2014 he was nominated as candidate of his party for the presidential elections in October, in which he was elected Senator of the Republic. He was defeated on the second round of presidential election on 30 November 2014.

2019 

In the 2019 presidential primaries, Lacalle Pou competed against Enrique Antía, Carlos Iafigliola, again Jorge Larrañaga and against the new candidate Juan Sartori, with whom he maintained a tense relationship. Lacalle Pou accused him of spreading fake news, some of these cases were brought to justice. Lacalle Pou won by 53% of the votes, enough to announce Beatriz Argimón the same night of 30 June as a vice president candidate.

In the first round of the 2019 general election, held on Sunday, 27 October 2019, he obtained second place with 28.62% of the votes. As no presidential candidate received a majority of voting, a runoff election took place on 24 November. In the runoff, Luis Lacalle Pou garnered 48.71% of the unofficial vote. His opponent, Broad Front candidate and former intendant of Montevideo, Daniel Martínez obtained 47.51% of the vote. The Electoral Court of Uruguay would publish the official results by Friday, 29 November 2019, as observed votes were still to be counted, totaling more than the difference between the two candidates, thus being too close to call. Daniel Martinez did not concede the race then, awaiting the official count. Lacalle Pou unofficially declared himself the winner, as the votes already counted marked an irreversible trend. Martínez conceded defeat on 28 November 2019. On 30 November, final votes counts confirmed Lacalle Pou as the winner with 48.8% of the total votes cast over Martínez with 47.3%. He was the first National/Blanco candidate to win the presidency since his father left office in 1995. His election also marked only the fourth time in 154 years that the Blancos had been elected to lead the government.

President of Uruguay

Inauguration 

Lacalle took office on 1 March 2020. After the constitutional oath before the General Assembly, he paraded down with Vice President Beatriz Argimón along Libertador Avenue in a 1937 Ford V8 convertible that belonged to his great-grandfather, Luis Alberto de Herrera. The parade ended in Plaza Independencia, where he received the presidential sash from the outgoing President Tabaré Vázquez.

With a coalition of five parties, ranging from the centre-left to the hard right, he intends to pursue a policy of austerity. During his campaign, he promised to cut government spending in order to reduce the public deficit. Claiming to be a liberal, he declared that he wanted to favour business leaders in the face of "tax pressure". He proposed before his inauguration to establish an attractive tax policy to attract wealthy foreigners. The left-wing party Frente Amplio deplores initiatives that could lead to a "setback" for the country, which risks becoming a "tax haven" again, as it was in the past.

Lacalle had announced during his electoral campaign the introduction of a package of government measures through an urgent consideration law, a prerogative of the Executive Power in Uruguay that allows it to send to the General Assembly a bill with a peremptory term of 90 days, expired which is approved in the affirmative form if the General Assembly is not issued to the contrary. The 2020 coronavirus pandemic delayed the presentation of the bill, which finally formally entered the Parliament on 23 April 2020.

Cabinet 
Lacalle announced his cabinet on 16 December 2019, which is formed by an electoral alliance, the Coalición Multicolor, which is made up of the National Party, the Colorado Party, Open Cabildo, the Independent Party and the Party of the People. He declared that it was going to be a "government of action", and that he wanted to form a "government that talks a lot with the people".

Foreign policy 

During Lacalle Pou's first days of presidency, Uruguay's foreign relations shifted substantially from those under Broad Front. After taking office, he condemned the government of Nicolás Maduro in Venezuela. And also Lacalle decided not to invite him to his inauguration stating "it is a personal decision, which I take care of. This is not the Chancellery, this is not protocol, this is my person who made this decision". The presidents of Cuba and Nicaragua were not invited either. However, the Lacalle government refused to recognize Guaidó as legitimate President of Venezuela and instead recognized him as President of the National Assembly stating that recognizing Guaidó at the same time that Maduro is in power is a "step that for now we cannot take." In January 2021, the Lacalle government refused to recognize the new National Assembly, and stated that the Maduro's "dictatorial regime" violates the "rule of law."

Lacalle's government ordered the withdrawal of Uruguay from the Union of South American Nations (UNASUR), arguing that it occurred because "it is an organization that became an ideological political alliance contrary to the country's objectives of linking." In addition, it was reported that the country would return to the Inter-American Treaty of Reciprocal Assistance (TIAR) and that the government would support Luis Almagro in a re-election to the post of president of the Organization of American States. Lacalle has been in favor of a relaxation of the Southern Common Market (MERCOSUR) rules, such as the common external tariff. He has also proposed to deepen the free trade zone.

COVID-19 pandemic 

The COVID-19 pandemic emerged within the first days of Lacalle Pou's presidency. The first four cases, all imported, were reported on 13 March. On 14 March, Lacalle requested the cancellation of public performances, and the closure of some public places. An awareness campaign was launched and citizens were advised to stay home. A two-week suspension of classes at public and private schools was also announced. On 16 March, Lacalle issued an order to close all border crossings except Carrasco International Airport. The border with Argentina was closed effective 17 March at midnight.

Lacalle refused to implement the lockdown, appealing for "individual freedom". On April, 17 he informed that his administration decided to create a group, made up of experts that would define methods and studies to advise the government. The experts would be: the mathematician, electrical engineer, and academic from the Latin American Academy of Sciences, Fernando Paganini; Dr. Rafael Radi, the first Uruguayan scientist at the National Academy of Sciences of the United States and president of the National Academy of Sciences of Uruguay; and Dr. Henry Cohen, President of the National Academy of Medicine and awarded as a Master by the World Gastroenterology Organisation in 2019. The group disbanded after 14 months.

At the beginning, its measures were praised, when the country was facing a relative control of the situation and a low number of cases per day. By the beginning of 2021, infections started to increase to almost 8,000 cases per day, until the end of July when it started to decrease again. In January 2022, daily cases peaked at 14,000 cases per day for four months before declining.

Economic policy and 2022 referendum 
In April 2020, the Lacalle administration presented a bill "of urgent consideration" –power of the Executive Branch of the Government according to Article 168 of the Constitution. It contained modifications in different areas, such as the economy, public safety, education, and work. It was approved in both the Senate and the Chamber of Representatives, and signed into law on 9 July 2020. Opposition to the law consisted of the national trade union center PIT-CNT and the opposition party Broad Front, which launched a campaign to collect signatures to file a referendum appeal on 135 articles of the law. Finally, a referendum was held on 27 March 2022, in which the option not to repeal 135 of the law was imposed with 50% of the votes, compared to the option in favor of repeal with 48%.

The government's plan to privatize public companies such as the telecommunications company ANTEL, the port of Montevideo and the national oil company ANCAP, led to large-scale demonstrations on 15 September 2021, in a well-attended 24-hour general strike called by the trade union movement. The strikers and demonstrators also want the government to take measures to fight unemployment and increase low wages.

The government is planning a reform to raise the retirement age from 60 to 65 years old.

Personal life
Lacalle Pou, who has played many sports (rugby, soccer, tennis, boxing, etc.) in his youth, now enjoys surfing, a sport he has been practicing since the 1980s. He married Lorena Ponce de León in 2000, in a service conducted by Daniel Sturla in the Montevideo Metropolitan Cathedral. Together, they have three children: Luis Alberto, Violeta and Manuel. In May 2022 the couple announced their separation and plans to get divorced.

See also
 List of political families of Uruguay

Notes

References

External links

 Representative Luis Alberto Lacalle Pou
 Presidential campaign website
 Biography by CIDOB

|-

|-

 
1973 births
Living people
People from Montevideo
Presidents of Uruguay
Anti-Masonry
Uruguayan anti-communists
Uruguayan people of Basque descent
Uruguayan people of Portuguese descent
Uruguayan people of Spanish descent
Uruguayan Roman Catholics
Members of the Chamber of Representatives of Uruguay
National Party (Uruguay) politicians
Presidents of the Chamber of Representatives of Uruguay
Members of the Senate of Uruguay
Candidates for President of Uruguay
Children of presidents of Uruguay
Critics of Islamism
Catholic University of Uruguay alumni
People educated at The British Schools of Montevideo